The Battle of Systerbäck took place on July 19, 1703 near the Sestra River during the Great Northern War. The Swedish army under the command of Abraham Cronhjort had to pull back to escape encirclement of the much larger Russian force under Boris Sheremetev. The two sides estimated their losses to 390 Swedish dead and wounded and 150 Russians dead and wounded.

References

Conflicts in 1703
1703 in Europe
Systerback
Systerback
Systerback
History of Leningrad Oblast